Celtic Woman: O Christmas Tree is the sixth Christmas-themed album by Irish musical ensemble Celtic Woman. The tracks were taken from the concert DVD, Celtic Woman: Home for Christmas, at The Helix in Dublin. It was the group's first album to consist entirely of live tracks. The album features vocalists Lisa Lambe, Susan McFadden and Méav Ní Mhaolchatha, and violinist Mairead Nesbitt. In contrast to the Celtic Woman: Home for Christmas album, O Christmas Tree does not feature vocalist Chloë Agnew.

Track listing

Personnel 
Per the liner notes.

The Celtic Woman Band
 Ray Fean - drums & percussion
 Andy Reilly - percussion
 Tommy Martin - uilleann pipes
 Anthony Byrne - bagpipes
Aontas Philharmonic Choral Ensemble
 Paul McGough - choral contractor
Discovery Gospel Choir
 Róisín Dexter - director
Irish Film Orchestra
 Catriona Walsh - orchestral contractor

Charts

References 

Celtic Woman albums
2014 Christmas albums
Manhattan Records albums